Chaetobranchopsis is a small genus of cichlid fishes from South America, where they are found in the Amazon, Paraná and Paraguay river basins.

Species
There are currently two recognized species in this genus:
 Chaetobranchopsis australis C. H. Eigenmann & Ward, 1907	
 Chaetobranchopsis orbicularis (Steindachner, 1875)

References

Chaetobranchini
Fish of South America
Cichlid genera
Taxa named by Franz Steindachner